The following are the national records in athletics in Morocco maintained by Moroccan Royal Athletics Federation: Fédération Royale Marocaine d’Athlétisme (FRMA).

Outdoor

Key to tables:

+ = en route to a longer distance

h = hand timing

# = not ratified by FRMA or/and by IAAF

X = annulled due to doping violation

Men

Women

Mixed

Indoor

Men

Women

Notes

References
General
Moroccan records – Men Outdoor 2017 updated
Moroccan records – Women Outdoor 19 March 2017 updated
Moroccan records – Men Indoor 25 February 2017 updated
Moroccan records – Women Indoor 2017 updated
Specific

External links
 FRMA web site

Morocco
Records
Athletics
Athletics